John Mulaney & the Sack Lunch Bunch is a children's musical comedy special created by John Mulaney that debuted on Netflix on December 24, 2019. The show, directed by Rhys Thomas, was written by Mulaney and Marika Sawyer and inspired by classic children's television series Sesame Street, The Electric Company and The Great Space Coaster. Eli Bolin composed the music, with lyrics from Mulaney and Sawyer.

Performing with Mulaney are 15 child actors and singers, aged 8–13. Celebrity cameos include Richard Kind, André De Shields, David Byrne, Natasha Lyonne, Annaleigh Ashford, and Jake Gyllenhaal.

Summary 
The program is a one-hour long variety special that presents itself as one episode of a larger series. The special consists of several songs, skits, and activities interspersed with scripted segments of Mulaney chatting with the Bunch as well as unscripted interviews with both the children and the adult guest stars about their greatest fears and acting background.

Jake, ostensibly in character as a younger version of Mulaney, sings a song about his grandmother's boyfriend Paul and his many quirks, while wondering why the rest of his family hasn't accepted Paul.
Jonah summarizes a fictional book he has read called Sascha's Dad Does Drag and the Act Needs Work, a book with a comically frank depiction of drag culture from the perspective of the son of an aging drag queen.
Mulaney plays the producer of a fictional Sony Pictures Animation film called Bamboo 2: Bamboozled which is being focus grouped by the entire Bunch. The skit pokes fun at the kids' viewing habits and the tropes of modern western animation.
A father, played by Mulaney, hires a math tutor (André De Shields) to help his son Jonah with algebra. The Tutor performs an elaborate Dixieland-style jazz number about how not knowing math caused him to lose his eye - however, it turns out to be a shaggy dog story, with his eye being unexpectedly saved at the last minute, and he reveals afterwards that he had simply lost his eye by accident while performing the song.
A transitional scene focused on Googy, supposedly a recurring Sack Lunch Bunch character, is interrupted when Mulaney is forced to reveal to the kids that the actor who played Googy passed away, subsequently having a frank conversation about death.
During lunchtime, Orson breaks into song about how he will only ever eat one food: "a plain plate of noodles with a little bit of butter."
Mulaney and Tyler play a chess game and continually try to throw one another off with existential questions and absurd facts.
Suri urges Mulaney to play "restaurant" with her, only for the game to end abruptly when Suri refuses to allow him entry into her imaginary restaurant.
Actor Richard Kind has an unscripted discussion with Ava, Cordelia, and Camille about movies, his career, and their experiences in plays. Nearly every sentence contains the phrase "girl talk."
Lexi and her friend David Byrne prepare to put on a skit in front of the guests at her parents' dinner party. However, when all of the guests talk over the performance, she and Byrne launch into a musical number urging the guests to pay attention and explaining what they planned to do in the skit, including cartwheels, acting out the entirety of Frozen, and a fake newscast while wearing an enormous blazer.
Zell and Oriah perform a dramatic '80s-inspired power ballad wondering what happens to flowers at night.
Jacob and David Byrne make a papier-mâché volcano despite Byrne's childhood fear of volcanoes.
While Mulaney asks about the Bunch's top New York moments, Alex recalls a time he was in New York and saw a woman (Annaleigh Ashford) crying on the street. He wonders in song about what would happen if he had gone up to her and asked what was wrong, and imagines the friendship they may have shared if he had done so.
Special guest Mr. Music (Jake Gyllenhaal) attempts to demonstrate how one can make music without instruments. However Mr. Music, having failed to prepare for his segment, grows increasingly exasperated as the objects around the studio he tries to use as examples fail to make any sound.
The special ends with a final round of interviews with all of the child and adult performers.

Cast 

Adult cast

 John Mulaney as himself
 André De Shields as The Tutor
 Richard Kind as himself
 David Byrne as himself
 Natasha Lyonne as herself
 Jake Gyllenhaal as Mr. Music/himself
 Annaleigh Ashford as Sobbing White Lady
 Shereen Pimentel as herself
 Annamarie Tendler as herself
 Erin Quill as Lexi's Mom

The Sack Lunch Bunch

 Alexander Bello
 Tyler Bourke
 Ava Briglia
 Cordelia Comando
 Camille De La Cruz
 Oriah Elgrabli
 Jake Ryan Flynn
 Orson Hong
 Isabella Iannelli
 Jacob Laval
 Suri Marrero
 Zell Steele Morrow
 Jonah Mussolino
 Lexi Perkel
 Linder Sutton

Production 
Prior to working on the special both Mulaney and his co-writer Marika Sawyer had sought to do some kind of comedy bit involving children. One idea was a segment on Weekend Update called "Lil Weekend Update" which would have been anchored entirely by children, another concept was a Mulaney written stand up special performed by a ten year old. Neither of these projects ever came to fruition. Mulaney noted that during development, it was difficult for him to articulate to people exactly what he wanted, saying "It was a lot of telling people what it wasn't".

Mulaney noted that often adults talk down to kids, telling Entertainment Weekly: "When I see people interact with kids, I was always like, 'Why are you talking down to them? Why are you crouching on the floor talking in a high voice?' I don’t recall needing that as a kid." He theorizes that "kids think that they’re older than they’ve ever been. They believe they’re adults"; and as such he wanted a special that children and adults could watch together and laugh at the same jokes instead of the normal "this joke's for adults and this joke's for kids" approach often seen in children's entertainment.

While appearing on Patriot Act with Hasan Minhaj, Mulaney described the special as being inspired by other educational children's programs such as Sesame Street, Mister Rogers' Neighborhood, The Electric Company, and even more specifically, shows like Free to Be... You and Me, and 3-2-1 Contact.

The special is co-written by Marika Sawyer (Saturday Night Live) and music composer Eli Bolin (Sesame Street, Original Cast Album: Co-Op), who drew inspiration from musical influences including Burt Bacharach, Howard Ashman and Alan Menken, and Trinidadian calypso legend Mighty Sparrow. They turned to pieces like Maurice Sendak and Carole King's "Really Rosie", which Mulaney remembered from childhood, and Harry Nilsson's "The Point," which were also fueled by catchy songs and extremely relatable anxieties. "As a kid, we watched movies like Little Shop of Horrors and Clue, and they didn't seem inappropriate – and I don't think they are," Mulaney says. "But they had a lot of tension to them."

Music

Track listing

Discography 
 John Mulaney & the Sack Lunch Bunch (Drag City, 2019)

Release 
On November 22, 2019, Mulaney tweeted a poster of The Sack Lunch Bunch in a parody of the artwork from the original Broadway cast recording of A Chorus Line.

On December 12, 2019, Netflix released a promotional teaser, also directed by Thomas, that doubled as homage to Bob Fosse's classic film All That Jazz, consisting of nearly shot-for-shot recreations of the 1979 musical's opening, with Mulaney dressed all in black (just as Roy Scheider portrayed the character Joe Gideon).

On December 16, 2019, there was a premiere event hosted for The Sack Lunch Bunch where the film was screened for the first time.

On April 2, 2020, a Twitter Live event was hosted at 7PM in which anybody could watch The Sack Lunch Bunch and live tweet about it using the hashtag, #SackLunchWatch. Viewers could tweet their questions using the hashtag and members of the cast and creatives of the film would respond.

Reception

Critical reception 
The special received a 96% "fresh" score on Rotten Tomatoes and has an 87% on Metacritic.
Critic Alan Sepinwall of Rolling Stone Magazine, wrote "It is, like Galaxy Quest, The Princess Bride, or Jane the Virgin, one of those gems that manages to simultaneously parody a genre and be an excellent recreation of it." Critic Erik Adams, from The A.V. Club gave the special an A rating, writing, "The Sack Lunch Bunch is an unconventional package, but its ingredients are pure John Mulaney". Richard Roeper of The Chicago Sun-Times, and John Anderson of The Wall Street Journal both praised the special, describing it more as "effective conceptual art than a variety show".

Accolades

Future 
Mulaney has suggested in an interview with Vulture that he hopes to do another Sack Lunch Bunch special, and that he has material that did not make it into the first one that he hopes to explore in later specials. In July 2020, it was announced that Mulaney has signed a deal with Comedy Central for two more Sack Lunch Bunch specials, reportedly with the same cast.

References

External links 
 

2019 films
Netflix specials
Children's sketch comedy
Netflix children's programming
2019 comedy films
2010s English-language films
American musical comedy films
American children's comedy films
2010s American films